Christopher Franke (born 6 April 1953) is a German musician and composer. From 1971 to 1987, he was a member of the electronic group Tangerine Dream. Initially a drummer with The Agitation, later renamed Agitation Free, his primary focus eventually shifted to keyboards and synthesizers as the group moved away from its psychedelic rock origins. While he was not the first musician to use an analog sequencer, he was probably the first to turn it into a live performance instrument, thus laying the rhythmic foundation for classic Tangerine Dream pieces and indeed for the whole Berlin school sound.

After his departure from the group, he founded the Sonic Images record label, a new-age music label called Earthtone and the Berlin Symphonic Film Orchestra, and produced a number of solo music works. After leaving Tangerine Dream, his only live concert was on 9 October 1991 at the Astoria Theatre in London. He performed on stage with Edgar Rothermich (a.k.a. Richard E. Roth) who is also his producer and engineer on all his solo projects and film music after 1990.

Franke moved to Los Angeles in 1991 to pursue film work. In 1995 he scored the AFI short Requiem. He may be best known for composing the music for the science fiction television series Babylon 5, as well as the score of the anime movie Tenchi Muyo! in Love and in 2005 the music for German musical Ludwig² (with Konstantin Wecker).

Discography

Solo 
 1991 – Pacific Coast Highway
 1992 – Universal Soldier
 1992 – London Concert
 1993 – New Music for Films Vol. 1
 1993 – The Tommyknockers
 1993 – Klemania
 1993 – Journey to the Center of the Earth
 1994 – Raven
 1995 – Night of the Running Man
 1995 – Babylon 5
 1996 – Perry Rhodan – Pax Terra
 1996 – The Celestine Prophecy
 1996 – Tenchi the Movie: Tenchi Muyo! in Love (rereleased in 2002)
 1996 – Enchanting Nature
 1997 – Babylon 5, volume 2: Messages from Earth
 1997 – Babylon 5: In the Beginning
 1997 – Babylon 5: Thirdspace
 1997 – Pacific Blue
 1997 – Transformation of Mind
 1997 – Babylon 5: River of Souls
 1999 – Epic
 2000 – Babylon 5: Episodic CDs – 24 CDs x 30 minutes per CD (1997–2000)
 2000 – New Music for Films Vol. 2
 2000 – The Calling
 2001 – The Best of Babylon 5
 2003 – Music for Films Vol. 3 (2003) CD-R
 2004 – What the Bleep Do We Know!?
 2005 – Ludwig² – Das Musical
 2007 – Babylon 5: The Lost Tales

with Tangerine Dream 
Major releases
 1971: Alpha Centauri
 1972: Zeit
 1973: Atem
 1974: Phaedra
 1975: Rubycon
 1975: Ricochet (Live)
 1976: Stratosfear
 1977: Sorcerer (Soundtrack)
 1977: Encore (Live)
 1978: Cyclone
 1979: Force Majeure
 1980: Tangram
 1980: Quichotte (Live)
 1981: Thief (Soundtrack)
 1981: Exit
 1982: White Eagle
 1982: Logos (Live)
 1983: Hyperborea
 1984: Poland  (Live)
 1983–1985: Multiple film soundtracks
 1985: Le Parc
 1986: Legend (Soundtrack)
 1986: Green Desert (Recorded 1973)
 1986: Underwater Sunlight
 1987: Three O'Clock High (Soundtrack)
 1987: Tyger
 1988: Near Dark (Soundtrack)
 1988: Shy People (Soundtrack)
 1988: Livemiles (Live)
 1991: Canyon Dreams (Recorded 1986)

See also 
 List of ambient music artists
 Perry Rhodan

External links 

 Official website
 Sonic Images official homepage
 
 

1953 births
German electronic musicians
German television composers
Living people
Male television composers
New-age musicians
Private Music artists
Tangerine Dream members